Plastic is a 5-issue creator-owned Horror American comic book limited series written by Doug Wagner, illustrated by Daniel Hillyard, and colored by Laura Martin. Plastic is about retired serial killer Edwyn Stoffgruppen who has been trying to avoid trouble while on honeymoon with his love Virginia. The American company Image Comics published Plastic on a monthly basis with the first issue released on 19 April 2017 and the fifth and final issue released on 23 August 2017.

Publication history
The series consisted of five issues with the final issue published on August 23, 2017. The first issue released with positive initial reviews and three print-runs on the initial issue.

Plot
Plastic follows retired serial killer Edwyn Stoffgruppen and the love of his life Virginia, a sex doll he "met online", as they travel across America. Edwyn stopped killing in pursuit of Virginia's affection until a Louisiana business magnate kidnapped Virginia and demanded Edwyn kill again to gain her freedom.

Release Schedule

Collected editions
The series was released as a single trade paperback on October 18, 2017.

Reception

Reprints
Initial reception of the series appears optimistic with reviewers often citing the twisted and absurd storytelling. It proved so popular that Image Comics announced another print run a day after its initial release and once more a month later.

Critical reception
Robert Kirkman has been recounted saying that Plastic is "The weirdest shit I've ever read. I love it!".

Characters

Edwyn Stoffgruppen A delusional drifter trying to remain below the radar as he wanders from town to town with his love Virginia, Edwyn was a serial killer nicknamed "The Baggy Man" for his obsession with plastic, whose modus operandi was to decapitate those he considered offensive to his unique sensibilities and leave their severed heads in Ziploc bags, but he has since retired since starting a relationship with Virginia.

Virginia A plastic sex doll who is the object of Edwyn's affection.

References

External links
 Plastic at Image Comics
 Plastic at Comic Vine
 Comic Book DB

Image Comics titles
2017 comics debuts
Crime comics
Horror comics
Comics by Doug Wagner